Annette Sikveland (born 25 April 1972 in Stavanger) is a former Norwegian biathlete. During her career as biathlete Sikveland won three relay medals, bronze at the World Championships 1995 in Antholz, silver at the World Championships 1997 in Brezno-Osrblie and bronze at the 1998 Winter Olympics in Nagano. Her best individual olympic placing is 8th from the 15 km at the same Olympics. She retired as biathlete after that Olympics. She lives today in the German town of Schmalkalden. For a period, she lived together with the German biathlete Sven Fischer.

External links 
IBU Profile

1972 births
Norwegian female biathletes
Olympic biathletes of Norway
Biathletes at the 1994 Winter Olympics
Biathletes at the 1998 Winter Olympics
Sportspeople from Stavanger
Olympic bronze medalists for Norway
Living people
Olympic medalists in biathlon
Biathlon World Championships medalists
Medalists at the 1998 Winter Olympics
20th-century Norwegian women